This is a list of Dutch television related events from 2013.

Events
15 February - 14-year-old Laura van Kaam wins the second series of The Voice Kids.
5 July - Haris Alagic wins the fifth series of X Factor.
21 December - Julia van der Toom wins the fourth series of The Voice of Holland.
28 December - 9-year-old opera singer Amira Willighagen wins the sixth series of Holland's Got Talent.

Debuts

Television shows

1950s
NOS Journaal (1956–present)

1970s
Sesamstraat (1976–present)

1980s
Jeugdjournaal (1981–present)
Het Klokhuis (1988–present)

1990s
Goede tijden, slechte tijden (1990–present)

2000s
X Factor (2006–present)
Holland's Got Talent (2008–present)

2010s
The Voice of Holland (2010–present)

Ending this year

Births

Deaths

See also
2013 in the Netherlands